Katharine Margaret Poulton (born 1961) has been Dean of Ossory since 2010.
Poulton was educated at the University of Manchester and ordained in 1961. After curacies in Bangor, Seagoe, Kilwaughter and Greystones  she was the Bishop's curate at St George and St Thomas, Dublin from 2000 to 2010.

Notes

Alumni of the University of Manchester
Deans of Ossory
1961 births
Living people